The tornado outbreak sequence of May 2019 was a prolonged series of destructive tornadoes and tornado outbreaks affecting the United States over the course of nearly two weeks, producing a total of 400 tornadoes, including 53 significant events (EF2+). Eighteen of these were EF3 tornadoes, spanning over multiple states, including Nebraska, Kansas, Texas, Missouri, Oklahoma, Indiana, Iowa, and Ohio, with additional tornadoes confirmed across a region extending from California to New Jersey. Two EF4 tornadoes occurred, one in Dayton, Ohio, and the other in Linwood, Kansas. Four tornadoes during this outbreak were fatal, causing a total of eight fatalities. The deadliest of these occurred on May 22 near Golden City, Missouri, where an EF3 tornado took three lives, including an elderly couple in their eighties. The damaging series of tornadoes that occurred in Indiana and Ohio on the evening of May 27 during this event is sometimes locally referred to as the Memorial Day tornado outbreak of 2019, which became the 4th costliest weather event in Ohio history.

Overview
The final confirmed tornado total from this highly prolific outbreak sequence was 400, including 51 strong tornadoes and two violent tornadoes. Tornadoes were confirmed in 23 different states. On May 29, the U.S. had its 13th straight day with at least eight tornadoes, which broke the previous record of 11 days straight set in 1980. On the day when the record was broken, the U.S. had an average of 27.5 tornadoes per day during the outbreak. Only three days during this period did not see an EF3 tornado or stronger. An additional two tornadoes were also reported on May 30, after the streak officially ended.

While numerous tornadoes were confirmed in tornado-prone areas, other tornadoes touched down in areas well outside of these regions, including confirmed touchdowns in California, Oregon, Idaho, Nevada, Arizona, and New Jersey. By May 24, the state of Pennsylvania had already exceeded its yearly average number of tornadoes.

The thunderstorms associated with this outbreak sequence also produced frequent heavy rainfall, sometimes at record levels, on previously-saturated ground across the U.S. and eastern Canada. This resulted in widespread river and lakeshore flooding and flash flooding, which frequently interfered with emergency crews responding to tornado damage, and also interfered with National Weather Service damage surveys. The new precipitation also extended existing flooding along the Mississippi River system to record durations.

The May 2019 outbreak sequence is remarkable for its unusually low casualty rate relative to the number and intensity of tornadoes. Neither of the EF4 tornadoes in this outbreak resulted in a single death, in spite of one tornado being rain-wrapped, never clearly visible, and nearly a mile wide, and the other tornado striking a densely-populated urban area at night. A seamless forecasting system with nearly 30 minutes of lead time is credited for preventing deaths in these two cases.

Meteorological synopsis

May 17

The threat for organized severe weather on May 17 was first outlined five days prior, when the Storm Prediction Center (SPC) outlined the Texas and Oklahoma panhandles, as well as western Kansas, in a 15% probability contour. On the morning of May 14, this risk area was expanded and 30% severe probabilities were introduced as the SPC gained confidence in a widespread and prolonged severe weather outbreak. For the first time in the organization's history, a threat of severe weather was introduced for their entire day 4–8 period. By May 17, a dual enhanced risk existed across the Central Plains, one across much of Nebraska and the second across southwestern Texas. As a large scale upper-level trough ejected into the region, dew points in the low to mid-60s °F surged north in front of a dryline. A cap across the region allowed the atmosphere to become extremely unstable, while an eastward-moving dryline was expected to become the focus for severe thunderstorms later in the day. The SPC noted uncertainty regarding convective development farther south across southwestern Kansas into Oklahoma but mentioned that any thunderstorms would be capable of significant severe weather if they came to fruition.

By late afternoon, several discrete supercell thunderstorms formed across northwestern Kansas and progressed into western and central Nebraska. While weak and largely uniform wind shear caused several splitting storms that destructively interfered with one another, one supercell later in the evening formed within a strongly sheared environment, becoming intense and long-lived as it progressed northeastward. It produced seven tornadoes in total, five of which were weak. One EF2 tornado near McCook caused major damage to a house, outbuildings, and trees, while another EF2 northeast of Stockville rolled  hay bales and snapped twelve power poles. The strongest was an EF3 that extensively damaged or destroyed well-built structures at a farmstead near Stockville. Later in the evening, another long-lived supercell formed in southwestern Kansas where SPC had previously highlighted uncertainty in convective development. This supercell produced four tornadoes in areas southeast of Dodge City, including an EF3 and two EF2s. The EF3 tornado caused severe damage to farmsteads near the towns of Minneola and Bloom, and one of the EF2s touched down in the town of Lewis, causing damage there before striking several farmsteads. A total of 21 tornadoes were confirmed.

May 18–19

Into the morning hours of May 18, the large scale upper-level trough continued to shift eastward. Strong mid- and upper-level winds associated with this feature spread across much of Oklahoma and Texas, accompanied by dewpoints in the upper 60s to lower 70s °F and mid-level CAPE values on the order of 2,500–3,500 J/kg. While the prominent threat was expected to be damaging winds along an eastward-moving mesoscale convective system, the SPC noted the potential for embedded and brief tornadoes. Throughout the pre-dawn and early morning hours, a mixture of semi-discrete and linear thunderstorms developed across central and eastern Oklahoma down into northern Texas. Strong southeasterly surface winds ahead of this convection in Texas provided the impetus for prolific tornado production over subsequent hours as it moved toward the northeast. A long-lived supercell produced seven strong tornadoes as it progressed from near San Angelo, Texas, to northwest of Coleman. Three of these tornadoes reached EF3 intensity, including a large multiple-vortex tornado that struck Ballinger, where homes were left with only interior rooms standing, and a water tower was punctured by flying debris. The cities of San Angelo and Abilene both sustained direct hits from EF2 tornadoes, resulting in severe damage to many homes and businesses. Farther to the north, a brief but strong tornado occurred east of Geronimo, Oklahoma, ripping the roofs and exterior walls off of two homes and injuring one individual. Through the late morning and afternoon hours, a squall line progressed across eastern Oklahoma and northwestern Arkansas. In the presence of strong instability and very strong low-level shear, numerous tornadoes were confirmed across the region, all rated EF0 or EF1. Fort Smith, Arkansas sustained considerable damage from two separate EF1 tornadoes. Widespread damaging winds were also observed, reaching 100 mph (155 km/h) in some places.

By the early morning hours of May 19, the squall line that had developed the previous day was pushing through Louisiana, resulting in numerous embedded EF0 and EF1 tornadoes. The strongest of these tornadoes was a high-end EF1 that passed near Mamou, significantly damaging multiple homes and manufactured homes. Further the northeast the Storm Prediction Center had outlined two separate Slight Risk areas. One extended from Michigan down through Indiana, along with parts of Ohio and Illinois, and included a 5% risk area for tornadoes. The other covered upstate New York and Pennsylvania, along with portions of Maryland, West Virginia, and Virginia, and included a 2% risk for tornadoes. In Ohio, EF1 tornadoes caused moderate damage in West Alexandria and Huber Heights. In Pennsylvania, another EF1 tornado severely damaged homes near Cocalico, and caused temporary closure of the Pennsylvania Turnpike. A total of 45 tornadoes were confirmed.

May 20

On the morning of May 20, 2019, the Storm Prediction Center in Norman, Oklahoma issued a high risk for severe weather across western and central Oklahoma and northwest Texas. Characterized by extreme instability and low-level shear, along with a wind profile supporting the development of numerous widely spaced discrete supercell thunderstorms, conditions in place across this region were remarkably favorable for a large outbreak of violent, long-tracked tornadoes. As a precaution, many public school districts, private schools and colleges (including the University of Oklahoma) throughout Oklahoma announced during the afternoon and evening of May 19 that they would cancel all classes and extracurricular activities for the following day, if not hold classes during the morning only. Ironically, in response to the deaths of seven students at Plaza Towers Elementary School in Moore after an EF5 tornado hit that school and nearby Briarwood Elementary six years earlier on May 20, 2013, several of the public primary and secondary schools that canceled classes had since installed underground storm shelters for student and faculty use in the event that a tornado approached during school hours. The El Reno, Oklahoma school district—which has storm shelters at seven of its schools (six underground and one above-ground shelter)—was one of the few in sections of central and western Oklahoma under highest threat of significant severe weather that decided to hold regular classes that day; El Reno Superintendent Craig McVay defended the decision on safety grounds, acknowledging that between 75% and 90% of students in the district do not have shelters in their home. Businesses, churches and other venues also decided to cancel events and activities, while some city-government offices (including in Oklahoma City) and Tinker Air Force Base instituted liberal leave policies to allow employees to arrive home prior to the onset of severe thunderstorm activity. By midday, the SPC increased the risk of significant tornadoes in northern portions of the Texas Panhandle, southwestern and central Oklahoma (including the Oklahoma City metropolitan area) from 30% to 45%.

The Storm Prediction Center issued a Particularly Dangerous Situation Tornado Watch (the 197th severe weather watch issued in 2019) at 1:35 p.m. CDT for portions of the eastern Texas Panhandle and the Texas High Plains. A second PDS Tornado Watch (watch #199) was issued at 2:45 p.m.

Despite the extremely volatile and dangerous setup, the large outbreak of violent tornadoes that was expected did not occur due to the effects of more capping then expected, the smoke from the wildfires in Mexico, and the skies were overcast; however, several strong tornadoes did touch down in Oklahoma and Texas during the afternoon and early evening. A large EF2 tornado damaged homes, destroyed outbuildings, and damaged the roof of an apartment building in Mangum, Oklahoma. In Texas, another EF2 tornado destroyed mobile homes and RV campers near Midland. An EF3 tornado touched down outside of the nearby city of Odessa, destroying oil pump jacks and leaving behind a swath of ground scouring as it moved through open oil fields. A large EF2 wedge tornado also struck the town of Peggs, Oklahoma, significantly damaging homes and businesses, and injuring one person. A total of 39 tornadoes were confirmed.

May 21
On May 21, the Storm Prediction Center issued an enhanced risk for parts of Illinois, Missouri, and Arkansas, along with a slight risk for parts of Kansas and Oklahoma. A 10% risk area for tornadoes was in place over The Ozarks. Dozens of tornadoes occurred throughout the day, including an EF1 tornado that touched down in Tulsa, Oklahoma, damaging homes and trees, and injuring one person. An EF2 tornado occurred near Dale, Oklahoma, destroying a mobile home, while another EF2 caused considerable damage in and around the town of Mayetta, Kansas. The strongest tornado of the day was an EF3 that heavily damaged a brick home near Bern, Kansas, and left cycloidal scouring marks in open farm fields. A total of 31 tornadoes were confirmed on May 21. This day, severe weather resulted in a fatal car crash, which killed two people, as well as the drowning of another driver in Perkins, Oklahoma. A baseball game between the Saint Louis Cardinals and Kansas City Royals was postponed due to the severe weather.

May 22

The outbreak on this day had been poorly forecasted. The initial risk issued by the Storm Prediction Center on May 20 was only marginal while also being well west from where the severe weather event took place. The next day the outlook was expanded and upgraded with a small slight risk, but that was issued in Eastern Kansas and Western Missouri and the main outbreak region was only in the marginal risk. On May 22, however, the risk area was shifted southeastward and an enhanced risk was added for northeast Oklahoma northeastward through southeastern Kansas into western Missouri. At 16:30 UTC, the enhanced risk was expanded and a moderate risk for severe weather was issued for those same regions, including a 15% hatched risk for tornadoes. The potential for strong tornadoes existed from Oklahoma City, Oklahoma to Columbia, Missouri. Before the main outbreak took place, an early-morning EF2 tornado struck near Adair, Iowa, with one fatality and an injury occurring at a home that sustained major structural damage. By 4:30 PM CDT, three Tornado Watches, stretching from north-central Texas to northwest and west-central Illinois were in effect, with two of them classified as PDS watches. That evening, an EF3 tornado struck the town of Carl Junction, Missouri, causing major damage to homes. This tornado occurred just north of where the EF5 Joplin tornado had occurred exactly eight years prior. The same parent supercell thunderstorm later produced the deadliest tornado of the outbreak sequence; a multiple-vortex EF3 tornado that destroyed several homes and killed three people near Golden City, Missouri. An EF2 tornado also caused significant damage in the town of Jay, Oklahoma. The most destructive tornado of the night was a high-end EF3 tornado that tore directly through Jefferson City, Missouri, where numerous homes, apartments, and businesses were heavily damaged or destroyed. At least 34 people were injured in Jefferson City, including one man who succumbed to his injuries a few days later. Overall, a total of 31 tornadoes were confirmed on this day.

May 23
On May 23, the Storm Prediction Center issued a moderate risk of severe weather for the Texas Panhandle, and an enhanced risk for western Oklahoma and southern Kansas. This included a small 10% hatched risk area for tornadoes. Further east, a separate enhanced risk was in place for much of Pennsylvania and part of Maryland, including a 5% risk of tornadoes. Later that evening, a large EF2 wedge tornado touched down near Canadian, Texas, snapping numerous trees and power poles, and destroying sheds and oil field equipment. The strongest tornado was an EF3 that occurred near the town of Laverne, Oklahoma. This large, intense tornado completely swept away an unanchored farmhouse, and mangled a pickup truck beyond recognition. In addition, numerous power poles were snapped along the path. In Illinois, which was under a marginal risk on this day, two EF1 tornadoes caused minor to moderate damage in the towns of Cisco and Muncie. The only tornado that occurred in the eastern threat area was an EF1 that caused tree and roof damage in Columbia, Maryland. A total of 22 tornadoes were confirmed.

May 24
Throughout May 24, a series of weak tornadoes touched down across the Central United States, resulting in mostly minor damage. An EF1 tornado struck the town of Marysville, Kansas, where trees and power lines were downed, a semi-truck was overturned, a few structures were damaged, and several gas tanks were thrown across a roadway. Another EF1 tornado struck Douglass, Kansas, causing considerable tree damage in town, and partially removing the roof of a building. The most significant tornado of the day was a high-end EF1 that touched down near Frytown, Iowa, where numerous vehicle trailers were tossed and destroyed and a trailer sales business, and outbuildings were destroyed. The tornado continued to the northeast, causing minor damage in the southern part of Iowa City before dissipating. Overall, a total of 20 tornadoes were confirmed on this day.

May 25

As persistent southwesterly mid-level flow continued to engulf the Central Plains, the SPC once again warned of the potential for widespread severe weather, outlining the Texas Panhandle, western Oklahoma, and southern Kansas in an enhanced risk. This included a 10% risk of tornadoes. An area of low pressure was expected to progress over the southern High Plains, supporting a southward-extending dryline and a northeast-extending cold front to the Iowa–Missouri border. Within the warm sector, mid-level CAPE values were forecast to rise upwards of 2,000–3000 J/kg, with dewpoints in the mid-60s °F as far west as eastern New Mexico. Thunderstorms began developing along the dryline in eastern New Mexico and western Texas around noon local time, though these storms were not tornadic in nature in the absence of strong low-level shear. By the late afternoon hours, more transient supercell structures had become apparent, leading to a few tornadoes across the Texas Panhandle. One such tornado was rated an EF2 as it struck the north edge of Plainview, Texas destroying outbuildings, a mobile home, and a cell phone tower. Several weak tornadoes also occurred across the Ohio Valley, where a well-defined shortwave trough combined with abundant moisture and sufficient instability to produce supercell thunderstorms. This included an EF1 tornado that caused moderate damage in Carrollton, Ohio. Hundreds of damaging wind reports were received as well. Through the evening hours, earlier discrete activity across Texas and Oklahoma congealed into an organized mesoscale convective system. Weak mid-level winds were expected to mitigate the tornado risk, owing to a severe thunderstorm watch across central Kansas down into central Oklahoma. At 10:28 p.m. CDT, however, a narrow but significant EF3 tornado embedded in the squall line moved through southern sections of El Reno, Oklahoma, causing severe damage, killing two people and injuring 29 others. Several other weak tornadoes also touched down around the Oklahoma City metropolitan area. A total of 17 tornadoes were confirmed.

May 26
Into the morning hours of May 26, the mesoscale convective system continued to push across eastern Oklahoma, leading to two simultaneous, large EF1 tornadoes in Sapulpa. These wide, but weak tornadoes caused widespread damage to trees, power poles, homes, and businesses in town. Into the afternoon hours, a concentrated risk for severe weather was once again expected to exist across the Central and South Plains. Several days of convection had eroded the elevated mixed layer throughout the region, but broad and intensifying southwesterly flow across northern Mexico was expected to reinvigorate this plume. Underneath the potent mid-level flow, rich low-level moisture was forecast to surge into western Kansas and eastern Colorado while mid-level CAPE values were projected to top 3,000 J/kg. While initiation of thunderstorms was expected in the early afternoon hours (with the threat for large hail being the primary threat initially in the presence of weak low-level wind shear), more expansive cloud cover and a stronger cap delayed initiation. Later in the day, a cluster of storms formed across portions of Nebraska and Kansas, with a severe squall line taking shape farther south across the Texas and Oklahoma panhandles as stronger upper-level winds arrived. Numerous tornadoes were reported throughout the area, most of which were weak. The most significant event of the day was a large, EF2 stovepipe tornado that passed near the town of Dora, New Mexico. The tornado damaged two homes, snapped numerous power poles, and completely destroyed a barn. Another EF2 downed electrical transmission lines near Earth, Texas as well. A total of 35 tornadoes were confirmed.

May 27 

As a strengthening mid-level westerly flow moved over the Midwest, the SPC issued an enhanced risk of severe weather at 0600 UTC, including at 10% risk of tornadoes that outlined the northern region of Illinois. At 1300 UTC, the risk was upgraded to feature the possibility of significant tornadoes, while still retaining its 10% probability. A lesser threat of tornadoes also existed in far western portions of Nebraska and northeast portions of Wyoming, as a prominent upper trough shifted east-northeastward from the Four Corners area into the High Plains. Significant tornado activity began early in the day, with an EF3 tornado that passed near Cantril, Iowa, destroying a farmhouse and a hunting cabin. A high-end EF1 also impacted the western fringes of Charles City, causing heavy damage to buildings at the local fairgrounds, a fertilizer plant, and a few homes. Throughout the afternoon, there was increasing concern over the possibility of strong tornadoes impacting the Chicago metropolitan area. Supercell thunderstorms developed in northern Illinois, and three tornadoes moved through the eastern suburbs of Chicago. However, these tornadoes were weak and only caused minor damage. As the supercells pushed into Indiana, strong tornadoes began touching down, including an EF2 that caused significant damage to homes and trees in the town of Pendleton. A large EF3 wedge tornado destroyed a house, multiple metal truss transmission towers, and several outbuildings near Akron. Another EF3 passed near Montpelier, destroying a trailer manufacturing warehouse, and severely damaging a dairy farm, killing numerous cows.

Tornado activity was expected to lessen after dark as the storms crossed into Ohio. However, unexpectedly high CAPE, shear, and helicity was in place in the region, and the activity only intensified as numerous tornadic supercells overspread the state, producing numerous intense tornadoes. An EF3 tornado destroyed numerous homes in Celina, Ohio and killed one person, while another EF3 passed north of West Milton and through the small community of Kessler, damaging or destroying many homes and outbuildings. The most significant event of the night occurred when Dayton, Ohio and its surrounding suburbs were struck by three powerful tornadoes in quick succession, with the tornadoes rated EF4, EF3, and high-end EF2 in intensity. Widespread major damage to numerous homes, businesses, apartments, industrial buildings, and other structures occurred throughout the Dayton metro. Remarkably, no direct fatalities occurred in the Dayton area, though at least 166 people were injured. May 27 was the most active day for tornadoes during the outbreak sequence, with a total of 59 confirmed tornadoes.

May 28 
Tornado activity that began in Ohio on the evening of May 27 continued into the early morning hours of May 28. An EF2 tornado passed near Jamestown, Ohio, severely damaging a house and destroying outbuildings. Another EF2 passed near Laurelville, causing significant damage to homes and trees, and tossing a propane tank and a truck. A high-end EF1 also struck Roseville, downing numerous trees and power poles, and damaging several homes.

Later that morning, the SPC issued an enhanced risk for severe weather at 0600 UTC; denoting a 10% risk of significant tornadoes along the Missouri and Iowa border as well as parts of Kansas, Nebraska, and Illinois. At 1300 UTC the SPC upgraded the risk to moderate for a 15% chance of significant tornadoes, namely around the MO/KS/NE borders; with a 10% chance of tornadoes extending southward to include much of eastern Kansas. By 2000 UTC the SPC had downgraded the forecast for significant tornadoes to 10%, but this time including Kansas City as the risk was shifted southward due to a stubborn cold front to the north. Further east, an enhanced risk was in place across most of Pennsylvania, along with part of Ohio and New Jersey. This eastern risk area included a 5% risk of tornadoes. Later that afternoon, an EF2 tornado moved through Morgantown, Pennsylvania, damaging numerous homes, businesses, and vehicles. Later that evening, a large EF4 wedge tornado grazed the southeastern edge of Lawrence, Kansas before impacting the western fringes of Linwood, destroying numerous homes and agricultural buildings, debarking and denuding many trees, and injuring 18 people. Further west, a large EF2 tornado passed near Waldo and Tipton, Kansas, snapping trees and power poles, and damaging several farms. Another EF2 tornado occurred near Kearney, Missouri and damaged a few homes, one of which sustained roof and exterior wall loss. A total of 27 tornadoes were confirmed.

May 29–30
On the morning of May 29, the SPC issued an enhanced risk of severe weather for eastern Texas, along with parts of Arkansas and Missouri. This included a 10% risk of tornadoes. An enhanced risk severe weather was also in place across Maryland, along with parts of Pennsylvania and New Jersey, including a 5% risk of tornadoes. An EF2 tornado ripped much of the roof off a house near Mabank, Texas, snapped or uprooted numerous trees, and injured one person. Another large EF2 tornado caused significant damage to homes outside of Canton, Texas. After the initial Canton tornado dissipated, an EF1 tornado touched down and moved through downtown Canton, causing considerable damage to businesses. Near Winnsboro, Texas, a third EF2 tornado downed many trees, caused significant damage to outbuildings, and destroyed a large poultry barn. Several weak tornadoes also occurred in the eastern part of the United States that afternoon and evening. A total of 42 tornadoes were confirmed. The following day, two weak tornadoes caused minor to moderate damage in Maryland. A weak landspout tornado remained over open country near Crownpoint, New Mexico, causing no damage before the outbreak sequence came to an end.

Confirmed tornadoes

Jasper–Golden City, Missouri

The deadliest tornado of the outbreak sequence began five miles to the southeast of Jasper, Missouri during the evening hours of May 22. The large and powerful multiple-vortex tornado touched down along Redbud Road, immediately reaching EF2 strength. Large wooden transmission line supports were snapped and a house had its roof torn off. A garage in this area also sustained roof damage. The tornado then crossed Sumac Road, inflicting significant damage to some homes and outbuildings in this area, and scattering debris across roads. The tornado then weakened to EF1 strength as it approached and crossed the Barton County line. Numerous trees and power poles were downed, a house sustained shingle damage, and a barn had its sheet metal roofing peeled off in this area. Continuing to the northeast, the large tornado rapidly re-intensified and reached EF3 strength as it passed to the west of Golden City. As the tornado moved across SE 80th Lane, three homes were badly damaged or destroyed. Two people were killed as a block-foundation farmhouse was completely leveled with debris strewn long distances through nearby fields. Another home sustained roof loss and failure of exterior walls. A metal equipment shed was mangled and destroyed, and large trees in this area were snapped and denuded. Maintaining EF3 intensity, the tornado then crossed the intersection of Route 126 and SE 90th Lane, where a brick home sustained roof and exterior wall loss, and a mobile home was obliterated and swept away, resulting in another fatality. In addition, large trees were snapped and a few other homes sustained roof, window, and siding damage. Beyond this point, the tornado began to weaken rapidly as it moved to the north of Golden City. A final area of EF0 tree limb damage was observed along E County Road U before the tornado dissipated. In addition to the 3 fatalities, one other person was injured by this tornado, which was rated EF3.

Eldon–Jefferson City, Missouri

This strong and destructive nighttime EF3 tornado first touched down west of Eldon, Missouri, snapping tree limbs near Foote Lane Road at EF0 intensity. It moved east, reaching EF1 strength and heavily damaging a poultry barn. The tornado entered town and moved along a northeasterly path through Eldon, maintaining EF1 intensity. Homes and trees in town were damaged, and a few homes lost large portions of their roofs. A small apartment building had its roof blown off, and a church sustained shingle damage. Cars along US 54 were damaged as the tornado exited town and moved to the northeast. Outside of town, EF1 damage continued to occur as outbuildings were damaged, trees were snapped, a mobile home was blown off its foundation, and homes sustained severe roof damage. The tornado then reached EF2 strength shortly after it crossed into Cole County, completely destroying two barns. Just beyond this point, the tornado passed over Lake Carmel, causing roof damage to numerous lakeside homes, one of which had it roof removed entirely. Weakening back to EF1 intensity, the tornado caused mainly tree and outbuilding damage as it continued to the northeast. Regaining EF2 status, the tornado ripped the roof off of a brick home and destroyed its attached garage as it crossed Highway D. A few other homes sustained lesser damage in this area as well. EF2 damage continued as the tornado crossed Loesch Road, destroying outbuildings and snapping numerous large trees. Two homes near the intersection of Probst Road and Beck Road lost much of their roofs as well. To the northeast of this location, the tornado widened as it entered a subdivision along the Heritage Highway, heavily damaging multiple homes at EF2 strength. Several mobile homes were also destroyed at a nearby mobile home park, and a large RC racing barn was completely flattened. Just north of the mobile home park, the tornado reached its peak point of intensity, where a house was leveled and swept away at high-end EF3 strength. Surveyors noted that this house was not properly attached to its foundation, and damage to nearby trees was not consistent with that of a tornado stronger than EF3 in intensity. A nearby home sustained low-end EF3 damage, sustaining roof and exterior wall loss, while another house near Twin Bridges Road sustained EF2 damage. Farther along the path, the tornado weakened to high-end EF2 strength as it crossed Moreau Ridge Lane and Hohm Way, tearing the roof and exterior walls from a house and obliterating several outbuildings. Additional EF2 damage occurred to trees, some homes, and outbuildings along Oakridge Road and points to the northeast. Maintaining EF2 intensity, the tornado then crossed Route CC, damaging or destroying several houses, outbuildings, manufactured homes, and a warehouse.

EF2 damage continued as the tornado reached the southwestern fringes of Jefferson City, where it impacted Donnie Braun & Sons Auto Repair and Storage. Several large storage buildings and garages were destroyed at this location, with debris strewn in all directions. Numerous RVs, trucks, and trailers were tossed and damaged as well. The nearby Tergin Motors building also sustained EF2 damage. Across the Heritage Highway, several homes were badly damaged in a small subdivision along Hiview Drive. The tornado proceeded to follow the CE Red Whaley Expressway into town, striking a car dealership, where approximately 500 cars were damaged or destroyed, with losses estimated at $15–30 million. Numerous vehicles were thrown into piles, and a large metal automotive service building was completely destroyed at high-end EF2 strength in this area. Just beyond this point, multiple restaurants and businesses were damaged, and injuries were reported at a Best Western hotel that was impacted. The tornado proceeded to cross Ellis Boulevard, heavily damaging multiple self-storage buildings, a gas station, a Sonic Drive-in, a church, and several other businesses. At the Hawthorne Park Apartments, EF3 damage occurred as several well-built, two-story brick apartment buildings had their roofs torn off, and sustained collapse of numerous second floor exterior walls. High-end EF3 damage was noted along Four Seasons Drive, where two large metal-framed industrial buildings were leveled to the ground. Metal support beams were severely mangled at this location. The nearby Jefferson City Job Center was damaged at EF2 strength, sustaining significant roof and wall damage. Cars in the parking lot were damaged by flying debris as well. Continuing through residential neighborhoods to the northeast, the tornado weakened briefly, with numerous homes sustaining EF1 roof damage along this segment of the path, though one home sustained EF2 damage along Holiday Drive. The tornado quickly regained EF2 intensity as it tore directly down Jackson Street, snapping numerous trees and power poles and ripping the roofs off of dozens of homes. A few houses in this area sustained high-end EF2 damage, sustaining loss of their second floor exterior walls. The Adkins Football Stadium also sustained considerable damage from the tornado. Maintaining its strength, the tornado then crossed over the Rex M Whitton Expressway and moved through the eastern fringes of downtown Jefferson City. Along this corridor, EF2 damage continued as numerous businesses, government buildings, and historic homes had their roofs ripped off, and many trees and power lines were downed. Simonsen Jr High School also sustained heavy damage and numerous broken windows. The historic Missouri State Penitentiary sustained severe roof damage and had many windows blown out, and a portion of the large stone wall surrounding the facility collapsed. Past downtown, the tornado crossed the Missouri River and weakened, causing only EF1 tree damage to the south of the Jefferson City Memorial Airport. The tornado then lifted and dissipated as it reached the Railwood Golf Club. At least 20 people required rescue from collapsed structures following the tornado, and multiple gas leaks were reported in the city.

At least 32 people were injured by this tornado, and one person was killed, with the fatality being a 61-year-old man who died of his injuries in the days following the tornado. The tornado was on the ground for 32.63 miles, reached a peak width of 1,500 yards, and had peak winds estimated at around 160 MPH. Jefferson City residents had at least 30 minutes advance warning before the tornado hit. The American Red Cross opened one shelter in Jefferson City and two in Eldon. Spokeswoman Sharon Watson says 50 people were at the Jefferson City shelter as of late morning. On May 27, Governor Mike Parson activated the Missouri National Guard to assist with clean up efforts.

El Reno, Oklahoma

At 10:28 p.m. CDT on May 25, a small QLCS tornado touched down just south of I-40 on the south side of El Reno, Oklahoma. The tornado inflicted EF0 damage to a gas facility along South Choctaw Avenue before crossing the Interstate 40. Reaching high-end EF1 intensity, the tornado struck the Diffee Ford Lincoln car dealership as it continued to the northeast. Multiple cars were flipped and moved at this location, and a large metal auto service building was badly damaged. The tornado then strengthened further, widening and intensifying to high-end EF2 strength as it tore through the Skyview Mobile Home Park. Multiple tied-down mobile homes were thrown and completely destroyed at this location, with large amounts of debris strewn throughout the area. Reaching its peak intensity, the tornado then struck the nearby Budget Value Inn motel at low-end EF3 strength. The second floor of the motel was almost completely destroyed, with numerous walls collapsed. A large metal dumpster was thrown and deposited on the second floor of the hotel, and cars in the parking lot were pushed into a pile and damaged as well. The tornado then weakened back to EF2 intensity as it crossed US 81, inflicting major structural damage to another car dealership, and damaging numerous cars in the sales lot. Power poles were snapped, and several metal light poles were bent to the ground as well. Weakening further to EF1 strength, the tornado narrowed and moved along a more due-easterly path, damaging trees and tearing part of the roof from a home along Southeast 27th Street. A few tree limbs were snapped at EF0 intensity at South Alfadale Road before the tornado lifted and dissipated.

Two deaths were confirmed as a result of this tornado, along with 29 injuries. Both of the fatalities occurred at the mobile home park. After the tornado, parts of US Route 81 closed.

Celina, Ohio

A strong and damaging EF3 tornado moved through the town of Celina on the evening of May 27. The tornado originally touched down west of the town, producing EF1 damage near the intersection of Township Line Road and Bunker Hill Road. Trees were snapped, a barn had its metal roof torn off, and two other barns sustained roof damage. Further east, EF1 damage continued as two homes lost a large amount of shingles. Reaching high-end EF2 strength, the tornado damaged multiple homes and outbuildings near the intersection of Hellwarth Road and Fairground Road, with the most severe damage being inflicted to a house that lost much of its roof and some exterior walls. Additional EF2 damage occurred as the tornado continued along Fairground Road and began to enter the northern part of Celina. A 300-foot cell tower was toppled to the ground, several homes sustained partial to total roof loss, outbuildings and power poles were damaged, and a large swath of trees was flattened as the tornado moved through a wooded area. As the storm entered a subdivision in northern Celina, it reached its peak intensity as numerous homes sustained EF3 damage. Many well-built homes in this area had their roofs ripped off and sustained collapse of numerous exterior walls. One man was killed in his home when an airborne vehicle smashed through the walls of his house. The most intense point of damage was noted at one anchor-bolted house in this area that was swept clean from its foundation and scattered through an adjacent field. Damage of this severity is typically rated at least EF4, though damage surveyors noted that the home's poorly-built block foundation actually came apart underneath the bolts, rendering them ineffective. A maximum rating of EF3 was applied as a result. The tornado maintained EF3 intensity as it continued across Touvelle Road and Jill Avenue, where at least two-dozen homes had their roofs torn off, some of which sustained collapse of exterior walls. Debris patterns in this area indicated that the tornado had a multiple-vortex structure at this point. The tornado then moved out of Celina and began moving along a more northeasterly path, weakening to EF2 intensity as it crossed Celina-Mendon Road. Many trees were snapped, and a house had its roof and some exterior walls ripped off. High-end EF1 damage was observed within the vicinity of SR 197, where a garage was destroyed and a home sustained heavy roof and wall damage. Just beyond this point, the tornado lifted and dissipated in an open field to the south of the small town of Neptune.

In addition to the fatality, eight people were injured. The town of Celina had also previously sustained significant damage from EF2 tornadoes that struck in 2011 and 2017.

Brookville–Trotwood–Dayton–Riverside, Ohio

During the overnight hours of May 27, a large and destructive EF4 tornado struck parts of Dayton and surrounding suburbs, resulting in widespread major damage and numerous injuries. At 10:31 p.m. EDT, the National Weather Service Weather Forecast Office in Wilmington issued a tornado warning for a thunderstorm with radar-indicated rotation over northeastern Preble and Montgomery counties. Ten minutes later, a tornado touched down west of Brookville, Ohio, causing minor EF0 tree damage along North Sulpher Springs Road. Moving due-east, the tornado quickly intensified to high-end EF2 strength and entered Brookville, where significant damage occurred. Numerous homes in town had their roof torn off, some of which sustained collapse of a few exterior walls. A wastewater treatment plant was badly damaged, while Brookville High School had much of its roof torn off. Many trees and power lines were downed, and a small automotive business was leveled as well. A pronounced hook echo and debris ball became evident on radar as the tornado tracked across southern Brookville. Past Brookville, additional homes were severely damaged in less populated areas to the east of town. The intensifying tornado then moved into the neighboring suburb of Trotwood and began moving along a more southeasterly path, reaching EF3 intensity as it struck densely populated residential areas. Numerous homes in Trotwood were damaged or destroyed, including several well-built homes that sustained total loss of their roofs and exterior walls. Multiple apartment buildings were heavily damaged as well, and numerous trees were snapped. The tornado reached high-end EF3 strength as it impacted the eastern part of Trotwood and exited town, inflicting major structural damage as it struck the historic Hara Arena building. In total, 500 homes were damaged and 59 were destroyed in the city of Trotwood, resulting in four hospitalizations. Another 30 persons without access to breathable air or medications as a result of the tornado were transported elsewhere.

Continuing along a southeasterly path, the powerful tornado entered the Dayton city limits and tore through the Shiloh neighborhood at high-end EF3 strength. By this point, the National Weather Service had issued a Particularly Dangerous Situation tornado warning at 10:50 p.m. EDT followed by a tornado emergency six minutes later for Montgomery County. Widespread, major damage occurred within the vicinity of Shiloh Springs Road, Turner Road, Shoup Mill Road, and North Main Street. Multiple commercial buildings were damaged or destroyed throughout this corridor, including multiple restaurants, self-storage units, a tobacco shop, and several other small businesses. 154 cars were totaled and another 50 were damaged at the Evans Arena car dealership, and dozens of homes were damaged or destroyed as well. Just beyond this point, the tornado strengthened further as it passed just south of Frederick Pike and moved along Riverside Drive. The River's Edge Apartments were devastated by the tornado, and multiple large brick apartment buildings sustained destruction of their upper floors in this area. No buildings were leveled in typical EF4 fashion at this location, though damage surveyors determined that such severe damage to such well-built structures was indicative of low-end EF4 winds. Along the northern edge of the damage path, the Foxton Apartments were also significantly damaged. In addition, the most intense winds appeared to have occurred in a wooded area along the Stillwater River, between the two apartment complexes. A massive swath of large hardwood trees was completely mowed down and debarked. Trees that remained standing in this area were completely stripped of limbs and bark, with only stubs of the largest branches remaining. Surveyors determined that such extreme tree damage was also indicative of EF4 intensity.

The tornado weakened slightly back to high-end EF3 strength as it passed north of downtown Dayton and moved through the Northridge area of Harrison Township. Widespread destruction occurred along North Dixie Drive and Wagner Ford Road as gas stations, hotels, churches, industrial buildings, and numerous homes and business were damaged or destroyed. The North Plaza shopping center was destroyed by the tornado, with large portions of the building completely collapsed. The Living Room, a nearby strip club, was completely destroyed as well. A small used car dealership was leveled, Grafton Kennedy Elementary School sustained loss of its roof and several exterior walls, and many trees were snapped and denuded in this area. Continuing to the southeast at EF3 strength, the tornado entered the Old North Dayton neighborhood of Dayton and caused severe damage to homes and businesses. Several large industrial buildings and factories, such as the Dayton Phoenix Group and a Frito-Lay distribution warehouse were largely destroyed. Numerous industrial vehicles, delivery trucks, and semi-trailers were thrown and tossed atop one another as well, and multiple very large metal storage tanks were crumpled and damaged. The tornado began to weaken as it moved through neighborhoods along Brandt Pike and Valley Street, passing northeast of Dayton Children's Hospital. A mixture of EF1 to EF2 damage occurred as many homes sustained minor to moderate damage, and some garages were destroyed. The historic Amber Rose restaurant sustained roof and window damage in this area as well. Crossing SR 4, the tornado then inflicted EF2 damage to the Action Sports Complex, badly damaging a large metal building at that location. The tornado then crossed the Mad River and struck the East Dayton neighborhood of Springfield. EF2 damage occurred along Springfield Street, where several industrial buildings and warehouses sustained major structural damage, metal truss transmission towers were blown over, debris was scattered throughout the area, and semi-trailers and vehicles were moved and damaged as well. Southeast of this point and further along the path, EF1 damage occurred in residential areas of East Dayton, with damage limited to roofs, trees, and power lines. The tornado continued at EF1 strength as it exited the Dayton city limits and entered the suburb of Riverside, Ohio. A swath of tree and roof damage occurred in town, and duplexes at the Overlook Mutual Homes complex had portions of their roofs torn off. The final point of damage occurred at the Colonial Village Apartments in Riverside, where roofing and brick facade was blown off of multiple apartment buildings. The tornado finally lifted and dissipated along Burkhardt Road, just west of the border between Montgomery and Greene counties after traveling .

Despite striking at night and producing major damage in a densely-populated urban area, remarkably, this tornado did not result in any direct fatalities. This was likely because most Dayton area residents heeded the warning issued as the tornado approached the city, and took shelter well before the tornado struck. In addition, only a small segment of EF4 damage was observed along the path, and was largely confined to a wooded area that was impacted. 166 people were injured by the tornado, however. In September 2019, the Montgomery County coroner ruled that an elderly Trotwood woman's death was caused in part by trauma from the tornado. She had been in poor health, and was trapped in her destroyed home following the tornado. However, her death was not officially listed as a direct tornado fatality in the National Climatic Data Center database. The tornado was the strongest to strike Ohio in nine years, and the first violent tornado to strike Ohio since an EF4 tornado hit Millbury, Ohio on the night of June 5, 2010. It was also the first violent tornado to occur in the month of May in three years.

Riverside–Beavercreek, Ohio

Shortly after the previous EF4 tornado dissipated in Riverside, Ohio, the same parent supercell quickly produced another strong tornado that touched down in the same suburb. The tornado touched down just south of the National Museum of the United States Air Force and immediately reached EF2 strength as it impacted the Prairies at Wright Field, and the Properties at Wright Field, which are two military housing developments for the nearby Wright-Patterson Air Force Base. Multiple housing units had their roofs torn off, and numerous large trees were snapped or uprooted at this location. Continuing to the east-southeast, the tornado crossed into Greene County, widening and strengthening into a large multiple-vortex tornado as it approached and crossed I-675, downing power poles and snapping or denuding numerous large trees on both sides of the highway. Just east of I-675, the tornado entered a residential area of Beavercreek, Ohio, a densely populated eastern suburb of Dayton. By this point the tornado had reached low-end EF3 strength, and numerous homes were damaged or destroyed in this area. Some of the most severe damage occurred along Rushton Drive, where multiple homes were left with only a few interior walls standing. Just east-southeast of this point, the tornado briefly weakened slightly as it struck a neighborhood along the west side of Grange Hall Road, where dozens of homes were heavily damaged or destroyed at high-end EF2 intensity. The tornado then intensified back to low-end EF3 strength as it crossed Grange Hall Road, and began moving along a more due-easterly path as it tore through the Fairfield Lakes apartment complex. The most severe damage at this location was noted along Anna Laura Lane, where multiple well-built apartment buildings sustained roof loss and collapse of their top floor exterior walls. Continuing to the east, the tornado weakened again as it entered the Spicer Heights neighborhood of Beavercreek at EF2 strength, where numerous homes had their roofs torn off, and a few sustained some exterior wall failure. Many trees were snapped and uprooted in this neighborhood, and parked vehicles were battered and damaged by flying debris. The tornado weakened further as it passed over Shaw Elementary School and moved through nearby neighborhoods at EF1 intensity. The school itself sustained minor roof damage, while numerous trees were downed, and many homes sustained roof damage. Additional EF1 roof, siding, and tree damage occurred as the tornado continued east and struck the Mallard Landing Apartments.

The tornado then intensified back to EF2 strength as it approached and crossed North Fairfield Road. Many restaurants and businesses including National Tire and Battery, Mike's Carwash, Primanti Brothers, Abuelos's, IHOP, Chick-fil-A, Aldi, two strip malls, and several office buildings sustained significant damage. A few of these structures sustained roof and exterior wall loss, and flying debris was impaled through the walls of other buildings. Further east, the tornado weakened again as numerous homes and apartment buildings sustained EF1 damage in the Stone Falls subdivision and neighborhoods further east. Along Kemp Road, a fire station was heavily damaged, and a historic barn was destroyed at nearby Wartinger Park. Two church buildings sustained relatively minor in this area as well, and many trees were snapped or uprooted. Continuing to the east, the tornado exited densely populated areas of Beavercreek and began moving through more rural areas. EF0 to EF1 damage was noted along Beaver Valley Road, Trebein Road, Ludlow Road, and Fairground Road. Damage along this corridor consisted of roof damage to homes, trees snapped and uprooted, barns and outbuildings damaged or destroyed, and a few metal truss transmission towers blown over. The tornado then caused additional minor roof, tree, and barn damage within the vicinity of Clifton Road and US 68 before dissipating to the north of Xenia, Ohio.

Several injuries occurred along the path, though no fatalities occurred.

Lawrence–Linwood, Kansas

On the evening of May 28, this massive, violent, multiple-vortex, rain-wrapped wedge tornado touched down at the north side of Lone Star Lake in Douglas County, Kansas. As the tornado formed, it absorbed the circulation of a smaller EF2 tornado that was moving along the east side of the lake. EF1 damage to trees and the roof of a house was observed at the beginning of the path. The tornado began to widen and strengthen as it continued just northeast of Lone Star Lake, snapping and uprooting numerous large trees at EF2 intensity. EF3 damage was observed as the tornado crossed East 850th Road, where many trees were denuded and partially debarked. Farther to the northeast, EF3 damage continued at the intersection of North 900th Road and East 1000 Road, where additional trees were debarked and a house was leveled at high-end EF3 strength. Several cars were tossed into a field, outbuildings were destroyed, and power poles were snapped nearby. Another house in this area sustained EF2 roof and wall damage. The tornado then weakened to high-end EF1 intensity as it crossed East 1100th Road, tearing a large section of roof from a house, and causing lesser roof damage to another nearby home. Quickly re-intensifying, the tornado crossed North 1000 Road at EF3 strength, where two well-built homes sustained loss of their roofs and multiple exterior walls. Several other homes in this area had their roofs torn off, one of which sustained high-end EF2 damage, with its roof and a few second-floor exterior walls ripped off. EF3 damage continued as the tornado crossed US 59 and North 1100th Road, where multiple homes had roofs torn off and exterior walls collapsed. Trees were snapped, outbuildings were destroyed, and a large truck was rolled as well. The large wedge tornado weakened to EF2 strength as it then grazed the southeastern fringes of Lawrence, snapping numerous trees and power poles. Outbuildings were destroyed, and a few homes along the outer edge of the damage path sustained minor damage. One house along East 1750 Road sustained high-end EF1 damage to its roof and walls. Past Lawrence, the tornado regained EF3 intensity as it moved through rural areas to the northeast of Eudora. Multiple well-built homes sustained roof and exterior wall loss, and a large masonry school building that housed a daycare center sustained major structural damage. Storm spotters reported multiple vortices with this tornado in this areas, many trees were denuded and debarked, and large amounts of debris was strewn through open farm fields.

As the rain-wrapped tornado crossed the Kansas River and moved into Leavenworth County, it snapped numerous trees at EF2 intensity. The tornado then reached its peak intensity as it struck the western outskirts of Linwood, where an anchor-bolted frame home was completely leveled and partially swept away. All that remained at this site was the home's basement and a pile of debris, and this point of damage was rated EF4. Scientific probes shot into the tornado by a research team recorded a windspeed measurement of 187 mph in this area. Several other homes at the western edge of Linwood sustained EF2 to EF3 damage, sustaining loss of their roofs and exterior walls. Numerous trees were snapped and denuded as well. The tornado then passed just north of Linwood and crossed 198th street, completely destroying numerous large metal agricultural buildings, as well as flipping and tossing multiple vehicles. As the tornado emerged from the rain, storm spotters again reported multiple vortices. A house was destroyed in this area as well, and damage along this portion of the path was rated high-end EF2. A mixture of EF1 and EF2 damage was observed as the tornado continued to the northeast through rural areas, impacting several homes. Damaged ranged from sections of roofing torn off to severe structural damage. Just west of Bonner Springs, the tornado crossed Linwood Road, causing EF1 damage to outbuildings. Some minor EF0 tree limb damage was noted at 150th Street before the tornado dissipated.

The tornado was rated EF4, and was up to one mile wide at times. It was on the ground for 55 minutes, and traveled a distance of 29.07 miles. No fatalities occurred, though 18 people were injured. The tornado dissipated shortly before it would have entered populated areas of the Kansas City metropolitan area. The Kansas City International Airport, over 40 miles away from the area affected by the tornado, reported debris on the runway. The large amount of debris led to dozens of flight cancellations. The tornado was the first violent tornado to strike the state of Kansas since a mid-range EF4 tornado came within close range of the towns of Abilene and Chapman on May 25, 2016.

Non-tornadic effects

Flooding
This storm system prolonged an ongoing heavy precipitation event across much of the southern Plains, Midwest, and eastern Canada, which included an unusually late, record-setting heavy snow event in the Midwest. In eastern Canada, the previous flooding was already being described as 100-year events. Several localities had broken April precipitation records before the additional rainfall from the May 2019 outbreak. The Quad Cities of Iowa and Illinois had just ended a record-breaking 51-day record for most days above major flood stage on May 12 before the new set of storms hit; many of the upstream cities along the Mississippi and Ohio were in a similar position. Much of the northeastern U.S. as well as eastern Canada had been dealing with continual rain since snowmelt, which had been causing previous extensive flooding. The addition of the wide-reaching heavy rainfall from the May series of storms to the already-saturated ground intensified river flooding and flash flooding effects.

Flash flooding
The torrential rain resulted in frequent flash-flooding. One-third of all flash-flooding reports during April and May came from Kansas, Oklahoma, and Missouri. A rare high-risk outlook for excessive rainfall was issued for the region surrounding Oklahoma City on May 20. By May 28, every single county in Oklahoma was under a state of emergency due to tornadoes or flooding. In at least one case, the NWS assessment team was unable to determine tornado-specific damage due to continuing flooding. On May 8, a man drowned in Austin, Texas after he was swept away by a flash flood. A woman drowned in her vehicle on May 21 after driving around barricades northeast of Oklahoma City. A four-year-old-boy was swept away in a flooded creek in Indiana. One person drowned in his van near Fort Chaffee, Arkansas.

River and lakeshore flooding
Large parts of the Mississippi River system were already in the midst of the longest-lasting flood fight since 1927 before the current severe storm exacerbated the situation. On May 21, Baton Rouge, Louisiana broke the previous record for its longest-ever flood event, at 136 days. Vicksburg, Mississippi has been in continuous flood stage since February 17. The Missouri River at Jefferson City reached its highest level since 1995. The Mississippi River at St. Louis reached a second crest in less than a month, surpassed only by the Great Flood of 1993. The Morganza Spillway upriver from Baton Rouge, Louisiana, will be opened on June 2 for the third time in its history; it is opened when river flows at the Red River Landing are predicted to reach 1.5 million cf. The Bonnet Carré Spillway has been opened twice in the same year for the first time since it was built in 1931. The flood flight was in its 216th day, and later surpassed the 1973 record of 225 days.

The Arkansas River and much of its associated watershed broke record flooding levels on May 26 and continued to rise during the following week. Water management systems protected Little Rock from record-level flooding.

Flooding in Canada broke records after the new round of storms. Several cities in Ontario, Quebec, and the Maritimes declared states of emergency, including Montreal, Quebec, Huntsville, Ontario, Fredericton, New Brunswick, and the twin cities of Ottawa, Ontario and Gatineau, Quebec. The new flooding blocked the Trans-Canada Highway near Fredericton.

Lake Ontario broke record flood levels on May 31 due to heavy rainfall and the record inflow of water it received from Lake Erie, and was still rising. On May 27, lakeshore flood warnings were issued along the New York shoreline between Monroe County and the Canadian border.

On May 14, two people drowned on a flooded rural road 40 miles north of St. Louis. One man died in Kay County, Oklahoma, on May 23 after being surrounded by floodwater from the Chikaskia River.

May rainfall records
Many locations in both the United States and Canada set new May rainfall records.

Kansas, Nebraska, and Missouri all broke their state records for most precipitation in May. Seven other states had precipitation totals in their top 5. Multiple localities in southern and central California broke rainfall records at the beginning of the sequence, including locations which had never previously reported more than a trace of rain in May.

Montreal, Quebec, which has kept records since 1871, tied its record for total May rainfall; and also set a new record for the longest stretch of days with rain, at 16.

It also tied its record for the longest stretch of days with rain, at 21. The extreme rainfall has significantly set back crop planting in the region for the 2019 season.

Bartlesville, Oklahoma broke its previous May record of 10.31 inches by more than four inches of rain. Wichita, Kansas and Enid, Oklahoma recorded their second-highest May rainfall with nearly 13 inches of rain.

Other non-tornadic effects
The severe storms that produced the tornadoes were accompanied by extremely heavy rainfall. The town of Zelienople, Pennsylvania received more than four inches of rain in 24 hours during May 28 and 29. On May 21, two people were killed in a traffic accident in Missouri when their vehicle lost traction in heavy rain.

Most of the tornadic storms were accompanied by strong straight-line winds and large hail. Baseball-sized hail was reported in Colorado and Nebraska. On May 28 and 29, softball-sized hail caused considerable damage in Armstrong and Venango counties, Pennsylvania. Severe thunderstorms also produced numerous reports of straight-line wind damage in both the United States and Canada.

Several high-use areas not directly struck by tornadoes were covered by extensive blown or falling debris.  In Dayton, the Ohio Department of Transportation used snowplows to clear debris from Interstate 75.  Although the May 28 tornado warning for Kansas City International Airport expired without a tornado after an hour, the airport had to stay closed to remove debris from its runways. The debris was deposited on the runways as a result of a violent EF4 tornado that had destroyed multiple homes in the Linwood, Kansas area, 47 miles away. The airport was not in operation again until after midnight, and flights were still being canceled as late as 7:30 am on May 29.

Aftermath
States of emergency were declared in every county in Oklahoma. Pre-existing states of emergency were extended in Iowa and Nebraska. States of emergency were also declared by the governor in Arkansas, Ohio, Mississippi, and Missouri because of the flooding and tornadoes. Texas extended a previous state of emergency due to Hurricane Harvey, but did not post any new declarations. The mayor declared a state of emergency in Zelienople, Pennsylvania, after it received more than four inches of rain in 24 hours. When the rain moved over Boston, a baseball game at Wrigley Field was postponed.

Transportation interruptions
Road, rail and air transportation was seriously affected by the flooding and tornadoes. Jefferson City Memorial Airport was closed due to flooding. Kansas City International Airport was closed for half a day while debris was removed from its runways. More than 500 roads were closed across Missouri, including Interstate 29 near the Iowa border. Interstate 75 near Dayton, Ohio was closed for a day while snowplows removed tornado debris. Amtrak experienced major disruptions across the Midwest and eastern U.S. All Amtrak service between Kansas City and St. Louis was suspended due to flooding from the Missouri River. Amtrak service between Kansas City and Hutchinson, Kansas, was also halted. Both routes were served by buses until the flooding abated. An Amtrak train was stopped between New York City and Pittsburgh on May 29 due to fallen trees.

Electricity outages
In the Dayton, Ohio region, 80,000 people were without power on May 28 and 29. People using generators in confined spaces led to an increase in hospital admissions due to carbon monoxide poisoning. In eastern Canada, electricity outages were minor, mostly caused by windstorms associated with the greater storm systems. Although they affected thousands of people at different times throughout the day, all power was restored by the end of the day.

Boil water advisories and water outages
Dayton, Trotwood, Montgomery County and parts of Greene County, Ohio were placed under a boil water advisory on May 28. Many of the same individuals affected by the boil advisory also lost most or all water pressure for a time due to a loss of power at two water-treatment plants and several pumping stations as one violent EF4 tornado, along with two other strong tornadoes (EF3 and EF2) moved through the city and nearby suburbs. This was the second major loss of water and boil advisory in the area within the year, following a similar event in February.

See also

 List of North American tornadoes and tornado outbreaks
 Tornado outbreak sequence of May 2003
 Tornado outbreak sequence of May 2004
 Tornado outbreak of April 13–15, 2019
 Tornado outbreak of April 17–19, 2019

References

Tornado 2019-05
Tornado 2019-05
Tornado 2019-05
Tornado 2019-05
Tornado 2019-05
Tornado 2019-05
Tornado 2019-05
Tornado 2019-05
Tornadoes in Arizona
Tornadoes in Arkansas
Tornadoes in California
Tornadoes in Colorado
Tornadoes in Florida
Tornadoes in Idaho
Tornadoes in Illinois
Tornadoes in Indiana
Tornadoes in Iowa
Tornadoes in Kansas
Tornadoes in Maryland
Tornadoes in Michigan
Tornadoes in Minnesota
Tornadoes in Missouri
Tornadoes in Nebraska
Tornadoes in New Mexico
Tornadoes in Nevada
Tornadoes in North Dakota
Tornadoes in Ohio
Tornadoes in Oklahoma
Tornadoes in Pennsylvania
Tornadoes in Texas
Tornadoes in Wisconsin
Tornadoes of 2019
F4 tornadoes by date